The 13th Ananda Vikatan Cinema Awards ceremony honoring the winners and nominees of the best of Tamil cinema in 2019 is an event that was held on 11 January 2020 in Chennai, India.

Awards and nominations

Superlatives

See also
 Ananda Vikatan Cinema Awards
 List of Tamil films of 2019

References

2020 Indian film awards